(Grant us peace) is a chorale cantata by Felix Mendelssohn, setting a prayer for peace by Martin Luther. Mendelssohn composed the short work in one movement for mixed choir and orchestra in 1831.

History 
It was a regular close of church services in Luther's time.

Mendelssohn was exposed to Lutheran hymns during his studies with Carl Friedrich Zelter, and when he revived Bach's St Matthew Passion in 1829, which was at the time thought to be the centenary of its first performance. He composed  in 1831 as one of eight chorale cantatas based on Lutheran hymns which he wrote as studies. He later chose only  for publication.

The composition was published, edited by Julius Rietz, by Breitkopf & Härtel as part of Mendelssohn's complete works in 1875. Carus-Verlag published it in 1980, edited by Günter Graulich, including an organ version. It has the text in German and Latin, which Mendelssohn had added, "Dona nobis pacem, Domine", and an English translation "In thy mercy grant us peace".

Music 
Mendelssohn did not use the melody which was associated with Luther's text, which is surprising because he retained the traditional melody from Luther's similar German Agnus Dei as a cantus firmus when he composed his first chorale cantata, Christe, du Lamm Gottes. His new melody follows the style of recent hymns in clear major-key tonality.

Originally Mendelssohn planned to use "cellos and basses", but in the final version scored the work for four-part choir SATB and an orchestra of two flutes, two clarinets, two bassoons, two violins, viola, two cellos and double bass. It is in E-flat major and marked Andante. The melody appears three times, rendering the complete text each time. It is introduced by the basses alone, then repeated by the altos, with the basses singing counterpoint, and finally appears in the sopranos with a mostly homophonic four-part setting. The instruments provide independent moving material, with different scoring for the three entries.

Robert Schumann said about the composition: "The small piece deserves to be world famous and will become so in the future; the Madonnas of Raphael and Murillo cannot remain hidden for long."

References

External links 
 
 Mendelssohn Verleih uns Frieden in the Choral Public Domain Library
 Da pacem Domine text and translations in the Choral Public Domain Library
 

Compositions by Felix Mendelssohn
1831 compositions
Chorale cantatas